Wumpa's World is a Canadian/Chinese television series for children which first aired on many networks including Treehouse TV, The Knowledge Channel, APTN, TFO, Télé-Québec, CCTV, TVB and TDM with 26 15-minute episodes from August 2001 to May 2002. The pilot episode aired in late 2000. Today, the show's episodes are only seen in reruns late during the night and earlier during the day. The characters are puppets.

Characters 
 Wumpa (Lorne Cardinal) is a brown walrus who is a narrator that tells real-life stories which take place in the Arctic Circle. At the end of each show, Wumpa sings his very own "goodbye song" by playing a bass guitar that looks like a snowshoe. Most of the show's episodes end with Wumpa's goodbye song's most famous line, which is "Well, bye-bye, and don't forget, always keep your tusks shiny and your blubber clean". He only occasionally appears in the story itself.
 Zig  and Zag are two young snowmobiles. Zig is yellow and pink, while Zag is blue and orange. A bicycle bell is mounted on Zig's handlebars and a horn is mounted on Zag's.
 Tiguak (Tim Gosley) is a polar bear who lives in an igloo and mostly eats fish. He has a bed and a toy bear he calls "Mr. Snoozers".
 Seeka (Jani Lauzon) and Tuk (Julie Burroughs) are snow hares who live in a den with two entrances – one for each of them.

References

External links 
 Wumpa's World website

2001 Canadian television series debuts
2002 Canadian television series endings
2001 Chinese television series debuts
2002 Chinese television series endings
2000s Canadian children's television series
Canadian children's fantasy television series
China Central Television original programming
Chinese children's television series
Chinese fantasy television series
Stereotypes of Inuit people
Canadian television shows featuring puppetry
Chinese television shows featuring puppetry
Treehouse TV original programming
TVB original programming
Fictional pinnipeds
Television series about bears
Television series about rabbits and hares
Canadian preschool education television series
2000s preschool education television series